Madhur Bhandarkar (born 26 August 1968) is an Indian film director, script writer, and producer. In 2016,Bhandarkar was honoured with the Padma Shri, the fourth highest civilian honour, by the Government of India.

The drama film Chandni Bar (2001), won him the National Film Award for Best Film on Social Issues. Bhandarkar received the National Film Awards for the Best Feature Film and Best Director for Page 3 (2005) and Traffic Signal (2007) respectively. The drama film Fashion (2008) garnered him several accolades including National Film Award, Filmfare Awards nominations for Best Director and Best Screenplay. Madhur Co-Produced a Bengali film Avijatrik based on the novel Aparajito by Bibhutibhushan Bandyopadhyay, The film won National Film Award for Best Feature Film in Bengali in 2021 and this was Madhur's 5th National Award Madhur Bhandarkar has been nominated as society member of the Satyajit Ray Film and Television Institute by the Information and Broadcasting Ministry.

Career 
Madhur Bhandarkar worked in a video cassette library in Khar, a suburb of Mumbai. This gave him access to a large collection of movies and he studied film-making through it.

After trying his skills with small-time filmmakers as an assistant, Bhandarkar landed up as an assistant to Ram Gopal Varma. He even played his first cameo in his 1995 film Rangeela where he was the associate director to Ram Gopal Varma. A couple of years later he made his directorial debut with Trishakti which took more than three years to make and released in 1999. The film had a relatively low key cast and was largely ignored at the box office. After two years he directed Chandni Bar (2001) starring Tabu and Atul Kulkarni with a budget of Rs 15 million. The film was critically acclaimed and a box office success, which took Bhandarkar into the top league of filmmakers in Bollywood. He received his first National Award for this film and thereon won National awards for his films Page-3 and Traffic Signal. His movie Fashion (2008) also won National Awards for Best Actress (Priyanka Chopra) and for Best Supporting Actress (Kangana Ranaut). I can see his films has not got that much awards as much these deserve. Fashions shows the true reality of bollywood industry that can be the reason.

Madhur was conferred PL Deshpande Award a.k.a. Zenith Asia Award for significantly shaping the film making culture in his unique works and he has been described as 'the Film Maker of the First Decade of the 21st Century'. On the Silver Jubilee Year of Aashay Film Club, award ceremony took place on 16 Nov at National Film Archive Theatre during the eighth Pulotsav – An Art Festival in Pune. PL Deshpande was a renowned writer, stage and film actor and his literary works are still revered in Maharashtra and others parts of the world. In his honour, Zenith Asia Award was given to Madhur Bhandarkar and his film Chandni Bar was also screened during the fest amongst landmark 25 films from world cinema.

In Nov, 2010 National Film Archive of India (NFAI) announced to preserve all the films of Madhur Bhandarkar. Chandni Bar, Page-3, Corporate, Traffic Signal, Fashion and Jail found space in Government's Archival data for Indian films.

Personal life
Bhandarkar hails from a Marathi and Konkani speaking Gaud Saraswat Brahmin family. He is a school drop-out. He came from a middle-class family. As a result, Madhur had to take up various jobs. He worked at a video store as an errand boy and dropped off cassettes to people from many walks of life including dance bar girls and film stars. He also sold chewing gum at traffic signals and worked as an assistant to small-time directors for a salary of  1000.

He is a great devotee of the Hindu God Siddhivinayak and has been walking from his house in Khar, Mumbai to the temple for the past 18 years on every Tuesday. Madhur also regularly visits Vaishno Devi temple in Jammu & Kashmir and the Golden Temple in Amritsar. According to him, the film Corporate was his most difficult film as people in corporate world would shun him after he bared Page 3 culture in his earlier film. He took inspiration for Corporate from the Coke – Pepsi controversy. He has been invited to deliver lectures on corporate issues to management students after the release of Corporate. (Interview to TV channel IBN Lokmat on 26 November 2008) Bhandarkar married his girlfriend Renu Namboodiri on 15 December 2003 in Mumbai. They have a daughter named Siddhi.

Controversy

While in 2012, Supreme Court justices H L Dattu and C K Prasad passed an order quashing the ongoing criminal proceedings, noting that Preeti Jain did not want to pursue the case against Bhandarkar and that the Mumbai police had earlier called the claim false and thus given him a clean chit. Initially, in 2004, Preeti Jain, a model and actress, accused Madhur Bhandarkar of rape and lodged a complaint with the Versova Police where she alleged that the filmmaker had raped her 16 times between 1999 and 2004 with the promise of casting her in his films. She also alleged that he promised to marry her and produced SMS texts, where he had reportedly asked for sexual favours, as evidence.
Bhandarkar claimed that the complaint was cheating-related, not about rape. In 2011, a Mumbai court found substance in her complaint and asked Bhandarkar to face the trial. He challenged the lower court's order before the higher court, which too rejected his plea.
In 2011, the police filed a report where it stated that the claim against the filmmaker was 'maliciously false'. The court rejected this report and held there was prima facie a case against Bhandarkar.
The Bombay High Court confirmed the magisterial court's decision to continue with Bhandarkar's prosecution. In 2011, the Bombay high court asked the filmmaker to face the trial in the case. He challenged the court's order in Supreme Court. A Supreme Court bench quashed a rape case that had been filed against Bollywood director Madhur Bhandarkar on November 5, 2012.

However, prior to this, in 2005, in a bizarre turn of events, Preeti was arrested for hiring a contract killer to murder Bhandarkar. She was to pay Rs 75,000 to Naresh Pardeshi, the associate of infamous Mumbai don Arun Gawli to kill the filmmaker. Reports suggest that the model demanded her money back because the execution failed to take place. When Gawli was made aware of this, he instructed his lawyer to file a complaint against her at the Agripada police station. The rape case was cited as one of the reasons why she wanted the filmmaker dead. After a week long probe, the police arrested her while she was on her way to the Versova Police station.
The initial trial began at a fast-track court in Sewri, which shut down, and consequently, the case was transferred to the sessions court. She was awarded a three-year imprisonment and found guilty of conspiracy, aiding and abetting crime.

Directorial style
In most of his films, Bhandarkar's protagonist are females. (Tabu in Chandni Bar, Raveena Tandon in Satta, Konkona Sen Sharma in Page 3, Bipasha Basu in Corporate, Neetu Chandra in Traffic Signal, Priyanka Chopra in Fashion and Kareena Kapoor in Heroine.) The exception here being Neil Nitin Mukesh, who was cast as the protagonist in the movie Jail. He has also depicted gay characters in his movies like Page 3,Traffic Signal and Fashion.

In an interview, he said: "My movies are not exposes, maybe they just hold up a mirror to society. My movies are not judgmental; I just show what happens in our society, sometimes there could be a solution and sometimes there may be none. Life goes on.". Madhur is known for his hard-hitting and realistic films.

Filmography

As director, writer and producer

As actor

Television

Awards
 2016: Padma Shri, the fourth highest civilian award, by the Government of India.
 National Film Awards
 2007: Best Direction: Traffic Signal
 Sophia Awards at Syracuse International Film Festival 2014.
 Conferred with the prestigious British honour - the Creative Spirit and Visionary Director's Award for 2013-14 - at the House of Commons, London, UK
 State of Maharashtra conferred Bhandarkar with the Raj Kapoor Smriti Award for contribution to Indian cinema.

Achievements

International awards

 Chandni Bar, Best Film at Zimbabwe International Film Festival 2003 and Technical Award for Best Background Music Score at Moscow International Film Festival 2003.
 Page 3, Official Selection at the Raindance Film Festival, London 2006 and IFFLA Los Angeles 2006. Corporate, Official Selection at the  Berlin Asia-Pacific Film Festival 2006.
 Fashion, Official Selection at the 31st Moscow International Film Festival 2009, Festival de Festivals, St.Petersburg 2009 and Norway Bollywood Festival 2009.
 Retrospective of Page 3, Traffic Signal and Fashion with Russian Sub-Titles held by the Ministry of Culture, Russia and SOVEXPORTFILM in Moscow 2009.
 Retrospective of Chandni Bar, Page 3, Corporate, Traffic Signal, Fashion and Jail at the 33rd Cairo International Film Festival 2009.
 In 2009 he was awarded the Best Director for his Outstanding Contribution to Indian Cinema by the Ministry of Culture, Russia.
 A retrospective of five films made by the filmmaker were showcased at the 33rd Cairo International Film Festival in Egypt from 10–20 November 2009. The films included Chandni Bar, Page3, Corporate, Traffic Signal and Fashion. Bhandarkar was present for the International event.

Other awards

 Bhandarkar received the Society Leading Lights Leadership Award in March 2017.
 Mayor of Mumbai – Excellency Award (2006)
 Kalaranjani Awards – (2005)
 Kalakar Awards for Best Director (2007) for Corporate
 Pride of Nation Award
 Kesari Gaurav Sanman
 Lions Gold Award (2005–06) (2008–09)
 IMPPA Awards
 Asian Film Foundation Award (2008)
 Farsa Award (2009)
 Jury Special Salute - Mirchi Music Awards (2016)

References

External links

 

Living people
Film directors from Mumbai
Hindi-language film directors
1968 births
Marathi people
Best Director National Film Award winners
Recipients of the Padma Shri in arts
Filmfare Awards winners
20th-century Indian film directors
21st-century Indian film directors
Directors who won the Best Feature Film National Film Award
Directors who won the Best Film on Other Social Issues National Film Award